Christian Blake Proehl is an American football wide receiver for the Minnesota Vikings of the National Football League (NFL) and a music recording artist. He played college football at East Carolina.

Football career

Early life and high school
Proehl was born in Greensboro, North Carolina and grew up in Charlotte, North Carolina, where he attended Providence High School. As a senior, he caught 52 passes for 1,016 yards and 12 touchdowns and was named first-team All-SoMeck 8 Conference.

College career
Proehl was a member of the East Carolina Pirates for four seasons. He used a medical redshirt as a true freshman after suffering a season-ending injury at the beginning of preseason training camp. As a junior, Proehl caught 47 passes for 577 yards and four touchdowns. After his junior season, Proehl announced that he would forgo his final year at East Carolina to enter the 2021 NFL Draft.

Professional career

Proehl signed with the Minnesota Vikings as an undrafted free agent shortly after the conclusion of the 2021 NFL Draft. He was waived/injured on August 16 and placed on injured reserve.

On August 23, 2022, Proehl was placed on the reserve/PUP list to start the season. He was activated on October 17, then waived and re-signed to the practice squad. He signed a reserve/future contract on January 16, 2023.

Music career
While rehabilitating his knee injury in 2021, Proehl rediscovered his love for music, and posted a video of him singing for his Grandma which went viral. In March of 2022, he announced his first ever single release  titled "Falling Into You," released on March 25, 2022, which was written with a small circle of rising songwriters including Rachel Grae, Spencer Hendricks, Kaitlin Stark, and Austin Zudeck and Justin Thunstrom of Parkwild, who also produced the track.

Personal life
Proehl's father, Ricky Proehl, played wide receiver in the NFL for 17 seasons. His brother, Austin, played for the New York Giants but was released on August 16, 2022.

References

External links
East Carolina Pirates bio
Minnesota Vikings bio

Living people
Players of American football from North Carolina
American football wide receivers
East Carolina Pirates football players
Minnesota Vikings players
1999 births
Ed Block Courage Award recipients